Stephen S. Trott (born December 12, 1939) is a Senior United States circuit judge of the United States Court of Appeals for the Ninth Circuit.

Education and career

Born in Glen Ridge, New Jersey, Trott received a Bachelor of Arts degree from Wesleyan University in 1962. As a freshman at Wesleyan, Trott was an early member of the folk music group The Highwaymen. He received a Bachelor of Laws from Harvard Law School in 1965. He was a deputy district attorney for Los Angeles County, California from 1966 to 1981 and the chief deputy district attorney from 1975 to 1979. He was the United States Attorney for the Central District of California from 1981 to 1983. He served as Assistant Attorney General for the United States Department of Justice Criminal Division from 1983 to 1986, and Associate Attorney General from 1986 to 1988.

Federal judicial service

Trott was nominated by President Ronald Reagan on August 7, 1987, to a seat on the United States Court of Appeals for the Ninth Circuit vacated by Judge Joseph Tyree Sneed III. "He reportedly turned down the opportunity to be nominated for FBI director, preferring the Ninth Circuit vacancy instead." He was confirmed by the United States Senate on March 24, 1988, and received commission on March 25, 1988. He assumed senior status on December 31, 2004.

References

External links

 Stephen Trott '62 and The Highwaymen at Wesleyan (video) on the site of Wesleyan University
 

1939 births
Living people
20th-century American judges
Harvard Law School alumni
Judges of the United States Court of Appeals for the Ninth Circuit
People from Glen Ridge, New Jersey
United States Assistant Attorneys General for the Criminal Division
United States Associate Attorneys General
United States Attorneys for the Central District of California
United States court of appeals judges appointed by Ronald Reagan
Wesleyan University alumni